= Northwest Cattle Project =

The Northwest Cattle Project is an agreement between the United States and Canada, first announced on October 22, 1997, that was initially intended to facilitate shipments of live cattle from the states of Montana and Washington to Canada. Such shipments had been blocked due to Canadian animal health rules. Canada revised its animal health import requirements for live cattle entering from these U.S. states among other things by recognizing areas deemed to be at low risk for certain animal diseases. The project has since been expanded to many more U.S. states, particularly after the two countries signed a joint cooperation agreement on a variety of agricultural matters in late 1998.
